In 2022, major floods and landslides occurred in Brazil.

Late January–early February 

From 28 January to 3 February, a series of floods and landslides killed 28 people in Brazil.

Mid-February 

On 15 February, heavy rain in Petrópolis, Rio de Janeiro killed at least 231 people.

May 

From 27 to 28 May, heavy rains in Recife and Zona da Mata, Pernambuco killed at least 106 people. At least 5,000 people were displaced from their homes.

See also 
 Weather of 2022
 2020 Brazil floods

References 

2022 floods in Brazil
February 2022 events in Brazil
January 2022 events in Brazil
Landslides in Brazil
Landslides in 2022
May 2022 events in Brazil